Lantenay may refer to:
Lantenay, Ain
Lantenay, Côte-d'Or